Langton's Classification of Australian Wine is a listing of fine Australian wines compiled by wine-specialist auction house and online merchant Langton's. The Classification is a ranking of the best-performing Australian wines based on secondary market support over a minimum of 10 vintages. It was first published in 1991. The Classification is divided into three categories - Exceptional, Outstanding and Excellent - and new editions have appeared at intervals of approximately five years. The seventh edition was published in August 2018 and includes 136 of Australia's finest wines. Editions of the classification are identified by Roman numerals.

Langton's has been owned by Woolworths since 2009, until 2021 when it was spun off with other liquor businesses to make Endeavour Group.

Langton's Classification of Australian Wine VII
The most recent Classification was released in August 2018. Classification VII has three tiers; the Classification V had four tiers.
The new tiers are 
Exceptional: 22 wines in 2018.
Outstanding: 42 wines in 2018.
Excellent: 68 wines in 2018.

History of the classification
The first Classification was published in 1991, Langton's Classification of Distinguished Australian Wine I, had its background in a publication from 1990, the Langton's Vintage Wine Price Guide. In the 1991 classification, 34 wines were classified using three categories: Outstanding (A), Outstanding (B), and Excellent. Only one wine was classified as Outstanding (A): Penfolds Grange Shiraz.

Langton's sees its classification as "loosely modelled on the Bordeaux Classification of 1855", but with its regular reclassifications it is more similar to the Classification of Saint-Émilion wine, although with several differences: no official governmental recognition, a much wider geographic scope, and with several different wine styles classified using the same categories.

Langton's Classification of Distinguished Australian Wine II was published in 1996, and included 64 wines in four categories: Outstanding A (three wines), Outstanding, Excellent A, and Excellent.

Langton's Classification of Australian Wine III was published in 2000, and included 89 wines in the four categories also used for classifications IV and V; Exceptional (seven wines), Outstanding, Excellent, and Distinguished. From classification III, fortified wines ("Port") were no longer included.  This changed with the addition of Seppeltsfield 100 Year Old Para Vintage Tawny for Classification V in 2010.

Langton's Classification of Australian Wine IV of 2005 included 101 wines, of which 11 at the Exceptional level.

In 2009, Langton's was purchased by Woolworths. Despite concerns raised at the Australian Competition & Consumer Commission, the purchase went ahead, and Woolworths therefore owns the Classification.

So far (2018), no wine included in the top ("Exceptional") category has ever been demoted; this category remains the smallest but has progressively expanded to include additional wines with each edition of the Classification.

'Exceptional' category
In the Classification VI (2018), the following 22 wines are included in the "Exceptional" category. The year when the wines were included in the 'Exceptional' category (or its predecessor "Outstanding A") is indicated.

See also
 Australian wine
 Classification of wine

References

External links
 Langton’s Classification of Australian Wine

Australian wine
Wine classification
Woolworths Group (Australia)